
Year 884 (DCCCLXXXIV) was a leap year starting on Wednesday (link will display the full calendar) of the Julian calendar.

Events 
 By place 
 Europe 
 March 1 – Diego Rodríguez Porcelos, count of Castile, founds and repopulates (repoblación) Burgos and Ubierna (Northern Spain), under the mandate of King Alfonso III of Asturias. 
 Summer – King Carloman II reverts to the former fall-back of 'pay and pray', buying (with Danegeld) a truce at Amiens, while he raises 12,000 lbs of silver for the Vikings to depart. 
 December 12 – Carloman II dies after a hunting accident. He is succeeded by his cousin, Emperor Charles the Fat, who for the last time reunites the Frankish Empire.

 Britain 
 King Æthelred II of Mercia marries Princess Æthelflæd, daughter of King Alfred the Great. He accepts Wessex overlordship, and demotes himself to become "Lord of the Mercians". 

 Arabian Empire 
 January 6 – Hasan ibn Zayd, founder of the Zaydid Dynasty, dies after a 20-year reign at Amul. He is succeeded by his brother Muhammad, as emir of Tabaristan.
 May 10 – Ahmad ibn Tulun, founder of the Tulunid Dynasty, dies after a 15-year reign. He is succeeded by his son Khumarawayh, as ruler of Egypt and Syria.
 Fall – The Arabs sack the abbey of Monte Cassino in two raids (September and November). The bulk of the monastic community flee to Teano (Campania).

 Asia 
 March 4 – Emperor Yōzei is forced to abdicate the throne by Fujiwara no Mototsune, chancellor (kampaku) of the Japanese royal court. He is succeeded by his great-uncle Kōkō.
 The Huang Chao rebellion is suppressed by forces of Emperor Xi Zong, with the help of the Shatuo Turks. Chinese warlords rule the country, instead of the imperial government.

 By topic 
 Religion 
 May 15 – Pope Marinus II dies at Rome, after a reign of less than 1½ years. He is succeeded by Adrian III (also referred to as Hadrian III), as the 109th pope of the Catholic Church.

Births 
 Burchard II, duke of Swabia (or 883)
 Kong Xun, Chinese general and governor (d. 931)
 Zhang Yanhan, Chinese official and chancellor (d. 941)

Deaths 
 January 6 – Hasan ibn Zayd, Muslim emir of Tabaristan
 May 10 – Ahmad ibn Tulun, Governor of Egypt and founder of the Tulunid dynasty (b. 835)
 May 15 – Marinus I, pope of the Catholic Church
 June 11 – Shi Jingsi, general of the Tang Dynasty
 June 29 – Yang Shili, general of the Tang Dynasty
 July 13 – Huang Chao, Chinese rebel leader (b. 835)
 September – Buran bint al-Hasan ibn Sahl, Abbasid consort (b. 807)
 October 12 – Tsunesada, Japanese prince (b. 825)
 December 12 – Carloman II, king of the West Frankish Kingdom
 Al-Abbas ibn Ahmad ibn Tulun, Tulunid prince and usurper
 Colcu mac Connacan, Irish abbot and historian 
 Dawud al-Zahiri, Muslim scholar (or 883)
 Empress Cao (Huang Chao's wife)
 Domnall mac Muirecáin, king of Leinster
 Li Changyan, Chinese warlord and governor
 Shang Rang, Chinese rebel leader (approximate date)
 Wang Duo, chancellor of the Tang Dynasty
 Zhou Ji, Chinese warlord (approximate date)

References

Sources